Kenneth Edwards (born 30 December 1985) is a Jamaican taekwondo athlete, born in Kingston. He competed +80 kg event at the 2012 Summer Olympics.

References 

1985 births
Living people
Sportspeople from Kingston, Jamaica
Jamaican male taekwondo practitioners
Olympic taekwondo practitioners of Jamaica
Taekwondo practitioners at the 2012 Summer Olympics
Pan American Games competitors for Jamaica
Taekwondo practitioners at the 2015 Pan American Games
Central American and Caribbean Games bronze medalists for Jamaica
Competitors at the 2010 Central American and Caribbean Games
Central American and Caribbean Games medalists in taekwondo
20th-century Jamaican people
21st-century Jamaican people